Rahkla may refer to several places in Estonia:
Rahkla, Vinni Parish, village in Lääne-Viru County, Estonia
Rahkla, Rakvere Parish, village in Lääne-Viru County, Estonia